Chantal Ringuet (born in Quebec City) is a Canadian scholar, award-winning author and translator.

Biography 
After completing a Ph.D. in literary studies (2007, UQÀM, Honourable Mention), Ringuet has been a postdoctoral Fellow in Canadian studies at the University of Ottawa (2007-8) and earned a master's degree in International Management at l'ÉNAP (2009). Since 2014, she has been a Fellow at YIVO, the Institute for Jewish Studies in New York, scholar-in-residence at the Hadassah-Brandeis Institute in Boston and translator-in-residence at the Banff Center for the Arts and Creativity, research associate at Concordia University's Institute for Canadian Jewish Studies (Montreal) and lecturer at the Institut européen Emmanuel Lévinas (AIU) in Paris. In Winter 2019, she was writer-in-residence (visiting scholar) at the Schusterman Center for Israel Studies at Brandeis University. She is the first writer to stay in the Gröndalshause Literature City Residence in Reykjavik UNESCO City of Literature (October 2019).

Her research and creative writing stands at the intersection of literature and visual arts, Jewish studies and translation studies. Focusing on the preservation and transmission of the collective memory and the Jewish heritage worldwide, Ringuet acts as a "cultural translator" of the diverse forms of Jewish civilization and identity. She has contributed to many art exhibition catalogues and translated literary works focusing on the cultural hybridity pervading contemporary artistic practices, and on the intergenerational transmission of trauma in the aftermath of the Second World War and the Holocaust. She translates from Yiddish and English to French.

Her first poetry book, Le sang des ruines (Écrits des Hautes-terres, Gatineau, 2010) focuses on two narrative voices of Holocaust survivors; it was awarded the prix littéraire Jacques-Poirier in 2009. Her second collection of poetry, Under the Skin of War (BuschekBooks, Ottawa, 2014) (written both in French and English), was inspired by the British photojournalist Don McCullin. Ringuet is also the author of À la découverte du Montréal yiddish (Éditions Fides, 2011) and she edited the first anthology of Canadian Yiddish literature in French translation, Voix yiddish de Montréal (Moebius, no 139, Montreal, 2013). With Gérard Rabinovitch, she has published Les révolutions de Leonard Cohen (PUQ, 2016), which received a 2017 Canadian Jewish Literary Award. With Pierre Anctil, she has published a translation of the early biography of Marc Chagall (Mon univers. Autobiographie, Fides, 2017), launched for the opening of the international exhibition Chagall : Colour and Music at the Montreal Museum of Fine Arts, the biggest Canadian exhibition devoted to Marc Chagall.

According to Simone Grossman, professor at the Department of French language and culture at Bar-Ilan University, her poetry illustrates the power of "affiliative postmemory" (Marianne Hirsch) through the relation between image and text.

She has participated in many cultural and academic events, including at Harvard University, Yale University, the École des hautes études en sciences sociales (EHESS) and the Hebrew University of Jerusalem; and was guest lecturer at the University of London, the Université Sorbonne Nouvelle-Paris 3, the Toronto Jewish Literary Festival, KlezKanada, the Montreal Museum of Fine Arts, the Blue Metropolis and the Massachusetts Poetry Festival.

Bibliography

Books 
Forêt en chambre, Montréal, Éditions du Noroît, 2022. Avec des photographies de Marc-André Foisy.
 Alys Robi a été formidable, Montréal, Québec Amérique, 2021.
 Leonard Cohen, "Chanteurs poètes", Paris, Plon, collection Fidelio [archive], 2021.
 Duetto Leonard Cohen, Paris, Nouvelles lectures, 2019.
Leonard Cohen (John Zeppetelli, Victor Shiffman, Sylvie Simmons, Chantal Ringuet), exhibition catalogue, Montreal, Musée d'art contemporain de Montréal, 2018.
Un pays où la terre se fragmente. Carnets de Jérusalem, Montréal, Linda Leith Éditions, 2017.
 Les révolutions de Leonard Cohen (co-edited with Gérard Rabinovitch), Québec, Presses de l'Université du Québec, 2016.
, poetry (Inspired by the photographs of Don McCullin), Ottawa, BuschekBooks, 2014.
Voix yiddish de Montréal, anthology, Montreal, Moebius, no 139. Preface from Lazer Lederhendler, 2013.
À la découverte du Montréal yiddish, essay, Montreal, Fides. Preface from Sherry Simon, 2011.
Le sang des ruines, poetry, Gatineau, Écrits des hautes terres, coll. Cimes, 2010.
 (co-edited with Daniel Chartier and Véronique Pepin), Littérature, immigration et imaginaire au Québec et en Amérique du Nord, Paris, L'Harmattan, coll. «Études transnationales, francophones et comparées», 2006.

Translations

 Portrait d'un scandale. Le procès d'avortement de Robert Notman, translation of Elaine Kalman Naves (Portrait of a Scandal. The Abortion Trail of Robert Notman), Montréal, Fides, 2017.
 Shoshanna. Mère et fille dans les ténèbres de l'histoire, translation of Elaine Kalman Naves (Shoshanna's Story. A Mother, a Daughter and the Shadows of History), Montréal, Alias (Groupe Nota Bene), 2017.
 Mon univers. Autobiographie, translation (with Pierre Anctil) from Yiddish to French of Marc Chagall's Autobiography, Montreal, Fides, 2017.
 Les échos de la mémoire. Une enfance palestinienne à Jérusalem, translation of Issa J. Boullata (The Bells of Memory. A Palestinian Boyhood in Jerusalem), Montréal, Mémoire d'encrier, 2015.
 Momento. Morceaux de vie, translation of George S. Zimbel, (Momento. A Book of Moments), London, Black Dog Publishing, 2015.
 Forme et lumière. Le musée Aga Khan, translation of (Pattern and Light. The Aga Khan Museum), New York, Skira Rizzoli Publications, Inc., 2014.
 Voix yiddish de Montréal, (selected texts), Montréal, Moebius, no 139. Preface from Lazer Lederhendler. 2013.
 Légendes de Vancouver, translation of E. Pauline Johnson (Legends of Vancouver), Boucherville, Presses de Bras-d'Apic, 2012.

Prefaces 

Un poète yiddish traverse l'Atlantique dans Sholem Shtern, Voyage au Canada, Montréal, Éditions du Noroît, 2018.
Un beau ténébreux chez les nevi'im dans Leonard Cohen. Seul l'amour de Jacques Julien, Montreal, Triptyque, 2014.
 Une dame victorienne et une princesse Mohawk dans Légendes de Vancouver (Legends of Vancouver) de E. Pauline Johnson, Boucherville, Presses de Bras-d'Apic, 2012.

Articles (selection) 

 "When translation Becomes Homage", Words Without Borders (The online magazine for International Literature), Essays, April 18, 2018.
 "Leonard Cohen. 10 key Moments", Leonard Cohen. A Crack in Everything (exhibition catalogue), Musée d'art contemporain, Montreal, 2018. 
 "Divided Land, Fractured Souls", Lines, Banff Centre Winter Writers' Retreat Chapbook, Winter 2017, p. 18-19. (published under the name Chantal Ringer.

List of honours

Awards 

Canadian Jewish Literary Award, 2017, category "Jewish Thought and Culture"
Prix littéraire Jacques-Poirier 2009

Grants 

Doctoral grant, Fonds de recherche du Québec - Société et culture (FRQSC), 2003-2005
 Postdoctoral grant, Social Sciences and Humanities Research Council (SSHRC), 2007-2008
 Grants for Professional Writers - Creative Writing Program, Canada Council for the Arts, 2015-2022.
 Dina Abramowicz Emerging Scholar Fellowship 2015-2016, Max Weinreich Center, YIVO (Institute for Jewish Research), New York
International residency grant, Canada Council for the Arts, 2019

Residences 

Scholar-in-residence, Hadassah-Brandeis Institute, Brandeis University, Waltham/Boston, Massachusetts, 2016
 Writer-in-residence (Winter Writer's Retreat), Banff Center for Arts and Creativity, February 2017
 Translator in residence, Banff International Literary Centre (BILTC), June 2017
Writer-in-Residence, Schusterman Center for Israel Studies, Brandeis University, 2019
Reykjavik UNESCO City of Literature Residence (inauguration), October 2019.

Human rights involvement
On September 20, 2015, Ringuet has participated in the 2015 Rock'n'Roll Marathon Oasis de Montreal in order to raise funds for the Montreal Holocaust Memorial Center. She has run in the memory of French writer and resistant Charlotte Delbo, and in the memory of all Jewish intellectuals who were deported in the concentration camps during World War II.

References

External links
 Web site of Chantal Ringuet
Chantal Ringuet - Reykjavik City of Literature's Writer in Residence 2019
 Conférence sur Akadem, "L'exil dans l'oeuvre de Leonard Cohen", Novembre 2014.
Robert Sarner, "Leonard Cohen turned this Montreal francophone into a champion of Jewish culture", The Times of Israel, July 28, 2018.

21st-century Canadian poets
Canadian Hebraists
Canadian women poets
Canadian poets in French
Writers from Quebec City
Living people
University of Ottawa alumni
Jewish culture
21st-century Canadian women writers
Yiddish culture in North America
Canadian people of French descent
Canadian women non-fiction writers
Year of birth missing (living people)
21st-century Canadian translators